Commando Helicopter Force (CHF) is a unit of the Royal Navy Fleet Air Arm and an element of the Joint Helicopter Command of the British Armed Forces. Its primary role is to provide Rotary-Wing support to 3 Commando Brigade Royal Marines and other UK force elements in the amphibious environment. CHF uses a combination of transport helicopters based at Royal Naval Air Station Yeovilton in Somerset, England.

History

The Commando Helicopter Force was formed in 1997 to consolidate command and control of the various Fleet Air Arm and Royal Marines helicopter squadrons which supported 3 Commando Brigade under Flag Officer Naval Aviation.

In 1999, CHF merged with various Royal Air Force (RAF) and Army Air Corps force elements under the Joint Helicopter Command, whilst maintaining its identity as a formed unit.

Elements of the force have operated in Northern Ireland (until 2002), Sierra Leone in 2000 and Bosnia; and it was an element of the amphibious force for Operation Telic, the British involvement in the 2003 invasion of Iraq, notably supporting the landings to secure the Al-Faw Peninsula. CHF was also a major part of Joint Helicopter Command's contribution to Operation Herrick in Afghanistan.

Following the Strategic Defence and Security Review of 2010, the decision was made to transfer all RAF Merlin HC3 helicopters to the Royal Navy under the command and control of Commando Helicopter Force. On 30 September 2014, the aircraft were formally handed over from the RAF to the Royal Navy; with the first Royal Navy Merlin squadron, 846 Naval Air Squadron, standing up concurrently and relocating from RAF Benson to RNAS Yeovilton on 26 March 2015.

The Merlin HC3 replaced the ageing Sea King HC4 as CHF's medium-lift transport aircraft when the Sea King HC4 retired on 31 March 2016.

As part of the transfer of service, the Merlin HC3 is undergoing an upgrade to the HC4 standard which includes a full mid-life upgrade of the airframe and avionics; and will 'marinise' or more accurately optimise the aircraft for ship-borne amphibious operations.

Location
It is based at Royal Naval Air Station Yeovilton in Somerset, England; aircraft are regularly deployed with 3 Commando Brigade, overseas and to the ships of the Joint Expeditionary Force (Maritime) (JEF(M)) which includes HMS Bulwark (Landing Platform Dock).

Command and control

CHF is a Fleet Air Arm asset and as such remains under the Operational Command (OPCOM) of Fleet Commander, while Operational Control (OPCON) is delegated to the Joint Helicopter Command, under Army Command, who will task assets in accordance with Permanent Joint Headquarters or Front Line Command requirements.

Organisation

The Commando Helicopter Force has three Naval Air Squadrons with separate roles:

 845 Naval Air Squadron – Medium-lift front line operations – Merlin HC4/4A 
 846 Naval Air Squadron – Medium-lift Operational Conversion Unit and Maritime Counter Terrorism Air Group (MAG) – Merlin HC4
 847 Naval Air Squadron – Light-lift and battlefield reconnaissance – Wildcat AH1
A Combat Service Support Squadron and Commando Mobile Air Operations Team also form part of CHF.

845 and 846 NAS received Merlin HC3s/HC3As to replace the retiring Sea Kings in 2014 and 2015. 846 NAS took their Merlin HC3s on 30 September 2014; 845 NAS followed on 9 July 2015. These are being upgraded to the Merlin HC4/4A as part of the Merlin Life Sustainment Programme (MLSP). The Merlin HC4 has a grey colour scheme, not the dark green colour of the "Junglie" Sea Kings.

Concurrently, 847 NAS has come to the end of the process of upgrading to the AgustaWestland AW159 Wildcat.

845 Naval Air Squadron 

845 NAS operated the Westland Sea King HC Mk4 helicopter; a variant that has been specially modified for medium-lift transport and flying in all sorts of weather conditions and terrains. 845 had at least two of it Sea Kings deployed to the Bosnian theatre since 1992. Besides Bosnia, they have operated in Albania, Egypt, Honduras, Nigeria, Sierra Leone, Iraq and Afghanistan.  845 NAS was temporarily stationed at RAF Benson in Oxfordshire as part of the Merlin transition until it relocated back to RNAS Yeovilton on 20 June 2016.

846 Naval Air Squadron 
846 NAS operates with 845 NAS, but has not seen action in Bosnia, being more focused on the Northern flank of the NATO theatre. Until recently, 846 maintained a base in Northern Ireland that allowed it to become very proficient in cold weather and winter operations. However, squadron operations are not limited to northern flying conditions and it has operated in South East Asia, Australia, the United States, and Germany. Two of the squadron's aircraft were sent to Turkey following the major earthquake it suffered in November 1999. 846 NAS was temporarily stationed at RAF Benson in Oxfordshire as part of the Merlin transition until it relocated back to RNAS Yeovilton on 26 March 2015.

In March 2016, 846 NAS was given the role of Maritime Counter Terrorism after the disbandment of 848 Naval Air Squadron and its Sea King HC4 helicopters.

847 Naval Air Squadron 

847 NAS operates Wildcat AH1 helicopters, in light transport and reconnaissance roles.

Decommissioned Unit

848 Naval Air Squadron 
848 NAS was the Commando Sea King HC4 training unit for the CHF, and trained not only the aircrews but also the ground crews. In addition to the skills necessary to fly their missions, Commando Helicopter Force members are trained in small-arms use as well as tactics and survival fieldcraft. Being a naval unit that was directly tasked with supporting the Royal Marines, trainees are also schooled in shipboard and amphibious assault operations. A special unit within 848 Squadron, M Flight, was tasked with supporting the Special Boat Service (SBS) in their operations. 848 NAS disbanded in 2013 but then reformed on 1 May 2015 to continue operating the Sea Kings, maintaining operational capability within the CHF while 845 NAS converted to the Merlin, until the Sea King reached its planned out of service date on 31 March 2016. 848 NAS disbanded 24 March 2016.

Personnel
Aircrew, recruited from the Fleet Air Arm and Royal Marines, join the force having completed training in helicopter operations under No. 1 Flying Training School at RAF Shawbury.

References

External links
Royal Navy – Commando Helicopter Force
Fleet Air Arm Association – Commando Helicopter Force

Royal Marine formations and units
Naval aviation units and formations of the United Kingdom
Military units and formations established in 1997